The Opatu River is a river of the Auckland Region of New Zealand's North Island. It flows south from the Okahukura Peninsula, reaching the Tauhoa River in the eastern reaches of the Kaipara Harbour.

See also
List of rivers of New Zealand

References

Rodney Local Board Area
Rivers of the Auckland Region
Kaipara Harbour catchment